Micranthes nivalis is a plant species in the saxifrage family. It is commonly called snow saxifrage or (ambiguously) alpine saxifrage.

Micranthes nivalis is a perennial plant which grows on damp, shady, base-rich rocks and cliffs where it normally occurs in crevices and on ledges in locations where it cannot be crowded out by competing plants. The flower is greenish white turning reddish as it ages with 5 petals and 5 sepals. The leathery, greyish green, rhomboidal leaves make up a rosette at the base of the stem and lie close to the soil surface, and are only sparsely haired.

The Latin specific epithet nivalis means "as white as snow', or "growing near snow".

This species is also found in Norway, Ireland, Svalbard, northern Germany, Poland, Russia, Canada, Alaska and Greenland.

The plant was first described by Carl Linnaeus in Flora Lapponica (1737), as a result of his expedition to Lapland.

Some populations from the Canadian Province of Quebec have been recognized as a distinct species by some authors, a variety of M. nivalis others:

Saxifraga gaspensis Fernald
Saxifraga nivalis var. gaspensis (Fernald) B. Boivin
Micranthes gaspensis (Fernald) Small

is distinguished from var. nivalis by smaller inflorescences and narrower leaves. It is known only from the Shickshock Mountains of the Gaspé Peninsula of southeastern Québec. It has been suggested that this may be a hybrid of M. nivalis and M. tenuis; further study is warranted.

References

nivalis
Flora of Alaska
Flora of Canada
Flora of England
Flora of Greenland
Flora of Ireland
Flora of Norway
Flora of Russia
Flora of Svalbard
Flora of Scotland
Plants described in 1753
Taxa named by Carl Linnaeus
Taxa named by John Kunkel Small
Flora without expected TNC conservation status